"Nowhere Fast" is a song recorded by American rapper Eminem featuring guest vocals from American singer Kehlani. It was written by Eminem, Mark Batson, Thomas Armato Sturges, and Tim James & Antonina Armato of Rock Mafia, who produced it with Hit-Boy. The song was sent to radio on March 27, 2018, as the third single from Eminem's ninth studio album, Revival (2017). An extended version was released ten days earlier on March 17, 2018.

Live performances
On March 11, 2018, the artists performed the song's extended version live at the 2018 iHeartRadio Music Awards. The performance centers around the theme of gun violence, featuring a new verse by Eminem at the beginning, which was inspired by the aftermath of the Stoneman Douglas High School shooting. Alex Moscou, a survivor of the shooting, introduced the performance with a speech: "We're tired of hearing politicians send their thoughts and prayers to us, and doing nothing to make the necessary changes to prevent this tragedy from happening again. If those elected to represent won't do what's right to keep us safe, we're going to be too loud for them to ignore."

Track listing

Credits and personnel
Credits adapted from Tidal.
 Eminem – vocals
 Kehlani – vocals
 Rock Mafia – production
 Hit-Boy – production

Charts

Release history

References

2017 songs
2018 singles
Eminem songs
Kehlani songs
Male–female vocal duets
Songs written by Eminem
Songs written by Mark Batson
Songs written by Antonina Armato
Songs written by Tim James (musician)
Song recordings produced by Hit-Boy
Song recordings produced by Rock Mafia
Works about gun politics in the United States
Aftermath Entertainment singles
Interscope Records singles
Shady Records singles